Manon Garcia (born 1985) is a French philosopher, specializing in feminist philosophy. Her book We Are Not Born Submissive (originally On ne naît pas soumise, on le devient) has been translated besides to English into several other languages, including Japanese, Chinese, Korean, German and  Spanish.

Life and work
She studied at the École normale supérieure and obtained the agrégation in philosophy in 2014. In 2017, she completed her doctoral thesis at the University of Paris I - Panthéon Sorbonne.

In 2016, she obtained a teaching position at Harvard University, then a research and teaching position at the University of Chicago.

According to her, there are two forms of submission: one by force, which leaves no choice but to submit, and another more complex one, involving a kind of "cost-benefit calculation". However, this submission would not be linked to any "feminine nature", but the result of social conditioning. She analyzes the causes that push women into submission, and highlights the paradox in a consented female submission, notably through the thought of Simone de Beauvoir, herself a model of contradictions between a form of submission in her personal life and a desire to revolutionize social norms.

Publications

In English

In French 
 (fr) On ne naît pas soumise, on le devient
 'Key texts of feminist philosophy' (ed.), Vrin, "Key Texts", 2021
 From Oppression to Independence: Beauvoir’s Philosophy of Love in The Second Sex (In French: 'De l’oppression à l’indépendance. La philosophie de l’amour dans Le Deuxième Sexe'), Philosophie, n° 144, 2020, pp. 48–63
 2021 : (fr) La Conversation des sexes

References

External links
2021 Interview in English at the Institut Français website

21st-century French philosophers
Feminist philosophers
University of Paris alumni
1985 births
Living people
Yale University faculty